Oliverio Jesús Álvarez González (born 2 April 1972), commonly known as Oli, is a Spanish retired footballer who played as a striker, currently a manager.

He was known for his flair and scoring ability, amassing totals of 414 matches and 110 goals in 14 professional seasons, nine of those spent in La Liga mainly with Real Oviedo. In 2006, he started working as a manager.

Playing career

Club
Oli was born in Oviedo, Asturias. He started his career with hometown club Real Oviedo, making his La Liga debut on 10 January 1993 in a 0–0 home draw against Albacete Balompié and being mainly associated with the reserves in his beginnings.

From 1994 to 1997, with Oviedo still in the top flight, Oli scored 40 league goals in 106 matches, 20 of which in his final season to help his team narrowly avoid relegation. Subsequently, he signed a six-year contract with fellow league side Real Betis, pairing up front with Alfonso and netting nine times in his first year in Andalusia.

In the 1999–2000 campaign, Oli could only score once for the Verdiblancos, who dropped down a level after finishing 18th. He returned to Oviedo in the off-season, going on to find the net regularly but also suffer two relegations in only three years.

Oli joined Cádiz CF from Segunda División in 2003, contributing ten goals from 40 appearances in his second year for a promotion and his first and only piece of silverware. At the end of 2005–06, with the team having been sent to where they had come from, he retired from football at the age of 34.

International
Oli won two caps for Spain during the 1998 FIFA World Cup qualifiers, against Slovakia and Faroe Islands. He scored in the latter fixture, a 3–1 win in Gijón.

International goals

Coaching career
Moving into coaching in 2006, Oli started precisely with Cádiz, but was dismissed after only a few months in charge as the team eventually failed to regain their top-flight status winning just four from 11 games with him. In September 2007, he was hired at Segunda División B side UD Marbella.

In the following two seasons, Oli continued in Andalusia and the third tier, successively with Écija Balompié and Betis B. On 23 May 2017, after several years of inactivity, he was appointed at Tercera División club Marino de Luanco on a one-year contract. In the summer of 2019, after achieving promotion to Segunda División B without conceding one single goal in the play-offs, he agreed to a new deal; in January 2021, however, he resigned as he felt he was not able to perform his job properly anymore.

Managerial statistics

Honours

Player
Cádiz
Segunda División: 2004–05

References

External links

1972 births
Living people
Spanish footballers
Footballers from Oviedo
Association football forwards
La Liga players
Segunda División players
Segunda División B players
Real Oviedo Vetusta players
Real Oviedo players
Real Betis players
Cádiz CF players
Spain international footballers
Spanish football managers
Segunda División managers
Segunda División B managers
Tercera División managers
Cádiz CF managers
Écija Balompié managers